An epitope, also known as antigenic determinant, is the part of an antigen that is recognized by the immune system, specifically by antibodies, B cells, or T cells. The part of an antibody that binds to the epitope is called a paratope. Although epitopes are usually non-self proteins, sequences derived from the host that can be recognized (as in the case of autoimmune diseases) are also epitopes.

The epitopes of protein antigens are divided into two categories, conformational epitopes and linear epitopes, based on their structure and interaction with the paratope.   Conformational and linear epitopes interact with the paratope based on the 3-D conformation adopted by the epitope, which is determined by the surface features of the involved epitope residues and the shape or tertiary structure of other segments of the antigen.  A conformational epitope is formed by the 3-D conformation adopted by the interaction of discontiguous amino acid residues.  In contrast, a linear epitope is formed by the 3-D conformation adopted by the interaction of contiguous amino acid residues.  A linear epitope is not determined solely by the primary structure of the involved amino acids.  Residues that flank such amino acid residues, as well as more distant amino acid residues of the antigen affect the ability of the primary structure residues to adopt the epitope's 3-D conformation.  90% of epitopes are conformational.

Function

T cell epitopes 
T cell epitopes are presented on the surface of an antigen-presenting cell, where they are bound to major histocompatibility complex (MHC) molecules. In humans, professional antigen-presenting cells are specialized to present MHC class II peptides, whereas most nucleated somatic cells present MHC class I peptides. T cell epitopes presented by MHC class I molecules are typically peptides between 8 and 11 amino acids in length, whereas MHC class II molecules present longer peptides, 13–17 amino acids in length, and non-classical MHC molecules also present non-peptidic epitopes such as glycolipids.

B cell epitopes 
The part of the antigen that immunoglobulin or antibodies bind to is called a B-cell epitope. B cell epitopes can be divided into two groups: conformational or linear. B cell epitopes are mainly conformational. There are additional epitope types when the quaternary structure is considered. Epitopes that are masked when protein subunits aggregate are called cryptotopes. Neotopes are epitopes that are only recognized while in a specific quaternary structure and the residues of the epitope can span multiple protein subunits. Neotopes are not recognized once the subunits dissociate.

Cross-activity
Epitopes are sometimes cross-reactive.  This property is exploited by the immune system in regulation by anti-idiotypic antibodies (originally proposed by Nobel laureate Niels Kaj Jerne). If an antibody binds to an antigen's epitope, the paratope could become the epitope for another antibody that will then bind to it. If this second antibody is of IgM class, its binding can upregulate the immune response; if the second antibody is of IgG class, its binding can downregulate the immune response.

Epitope mapping

T cell epitopes 
MHC class I and II epitopes can be reliably predicted by computational means alone, although not all in-silico T cell epitope prediction algorithms are equivalent in their accuracy. There are two main methods of predicting peptide-MHC binding: data-driven and structure-based. Structure based methods model the peptide-MHC structure and require great computational power. Data-driven methods have higher predictive performance than structure-based methods. Data-driven methods predict peptide-MHC binding based on peptide sequences that bind MHC molecules. By identifying T-cell epitopes, scientists can track, phenotype, and stimulate T-cells.

B cell epitopes 
There are two main methods of epitope mapping: either structural or functional studies. Methods for structurally mapping epitopes include X-ray crystallography, nuclear magnetic resonance, and electron microscopy. X-ray crystallography of Ag-Ab complexes is considered an accurate way to structurally map epitopes. Nuclear magnetic resonance can be used to map epitopes by using data about the Ag-Ab complex. This method does not require crystal formation but can only work on small peptides and proteins. Electron microscopy is a low-resolution method that can localize epitopes on larger antigens like virus particles.

Methods for functionally mapping epitopes often use binding assays such as western blot, dot blot, and/or ELISA to determine antibody binding. Competition methods look to determine if two monoclonal antibodies (mABs) can bind to an antigen at the same time or compete with each other to bind at the same site. Another technique involves high-throughput mutagenesis, an epitope mapping strategy developed to improve rapid mapping of conformational epitopes on structurally complex proteins. Mutagenesis uses randomly/site-directed mutations at individual residues to map epitopes. B-cell epitope mapping can be used for the development of antibody therapeutics, peptide-based vaccines, and immunodiagnostic tools.

Epitope tags

Epitopes are often used in proteomics and the study of other gene products.  Using recombinant DNA techniques genetic sequences coding for epitopes that are recognized by common antibodies can be fused to the gene.  Following synthesis, the resulting epitope tag allows the antibody to find the protein or other gene product enabling lab techniques for localisation, purification, and further molecular characterization.  Common epitopes used for this purpose are Myc-tag, HA-tag, FLAG-tag, GST-tag, 6xHis, V5-tag and OLLAS. Peptides can also be bound by proteins that form covalent bonds to the peptide, allowing irreversible immobilisation. These strategies have also been successfully applied to the development of "epitope-focused" vaccine design.

Epitope-based vaccines 

The first epitope-based vaccine was developed in 1985 by Jacob et al. Epitope-based vaccines stimulate humoral and cellular immune responses using isolated B-cell or T-cell epitopes. These vaccines can use multiple epitopes to increase their efficacy. To find epitopes to use for the vaccine, in silico mapping is often used. Once candidate epitopes are found, the constructs are engineered and tested for vaccine efficiency. While epitope-based vaccines are generally safe, one possible side effect is cytokine storms.

Neoantigenic determinant
A neoantigenic determinant is an epitope on a neoantigen, which is a newly formed antigen that has not been previously recognized by the immune system. Neoantigens are often associated with tumor antigens and are found in oncogenic cells. Neoantigens and, by extension, neoantigenic determinants can be formed when a protein undergoes further modification within a biochemical pathway such as glycosylation, phosphorylation or proteolysis. This, by altering the structure of the protein, can produce new epitopes that are called neoantigenic determinants as they give rise to new antigenic determinants. Recognition requires separate, specific antibodies.

See also 
 Cryptotope
 Epitope binning
 Mimotope
 Odotope
 Polyclonal B cell response
 Protein tag
 TimeSTAMP protein labelling

References

External links 
 Antibodies bind to conformational shapes on the surfaces of antigens (Janeway Immunobiology Section 3.8)
 Antigens can bind in pockets or grooves, or on extended surfaces in the binding sites of antibodies (Janeway Immunobiology Figure 3.8)

Epitope prediction methods

Epitope databases
 MHCBN: A database of MHC/TAP binder and T-cell epitopes
 Bcipep: A database of B-cell epitopes
 SYFPEITHI – First online database of T cell epitopes
 IEDB –  Database of T and B cell epitopes with annotation of recognition context – NIH funded
 ANTIJEN – T and B cell epitope database at the Jenner institute, UK
 IMGT/3Dstructure-DB – Three-dimensional structures of B and T cell epitopes with annotation of IG and TR – IMGT, Montpellier, France
 SEDB: A Structural Epitope Database – Pondicheery University, DIT funded
 

it:Antigene#Epitopo